Tetraceratobunus is a genus of harvestmen in the family Sclerosomatidae from South Asia.

Species
 Tetraceratobunus lineatus Roewer, 1915
 Tetraceratobunus lithobius Roewer, 1955
 Tetraceratobunus marmoratus Roewer, 1955

References

Harvestmen
Harvestman genera